The cotingas (Cotingidae) are a clade of suboscines bird species of neotropical distribution in South America and Central America. The group contains more than 60 living species and is in the clade Tyrannides (along with Pipridae, Oxyruncidae, Onychorhynchidae, Tityridae, Pipritidae, Platyrinchidae, Tachurididae, Rhynchocyclidae, Tyrannidae, Melanopareiidae, Conopophagidae, Thamnophilidae, Grallariidae, Rhinocryptidae, Formicariidae, and Furnariidae). The International Ornithological Committee (IOC) recognizes these 66 species of cotingas distributed among 24 genera, nine of which have only one species.

This list is presented according to the IOC taxonomic sequence and can also be sorted alphabetically by common name and binomial.

References

Cotingidae